Olive Hasbrouck (1907–1976) was an American film actress of the silent era.

Hasbrouck and her mother moved from Boise to Hollywood, where Hasbrouck attended Hollywood High School. She began working in films as an extra at Universal City. When she was 17, she had the lead female role in Ridgeway of Montana. In January 1929, she signed with First National, with the studio slating her to be the leading lady in The Royal Rider.

Hasbrouck retired when sound films were introduced.

Partial filmography

 Big Timber (1924)
 Ridgeway of Montana (1924)
 The Call of Courage (1925)
 Hidden Loot (1925)
 The Cohens and Kellys (1926)
 The Interferin' Gent (1926)
 Rustlers' Ranch (1926)
 A Six Shootin' Romance (1926)
 The Border Sheriff (1926)
 A Regular Scout (1926)
 The Two-Gun Man (1926)
 The Ridin' Rascal (1926)
 White Pebbles (1927)
 Set Free (1927)
 Ride 'em High (1927)
 Pals in Peril (1927)
 The Fighting Three (1927)
 The Obligin' Buckaroo (1927)
 The Ridin' Rowdy (1927)
 Tearin' Into Trouble (1927)
 The Shamrock and the Rose (1927)
 The Woman Who Did Not Care (1927)
 Desperate Courage (1928)
 The Cowboy Cavalier (1928)
 The Charge of the Gauchos (1928)
 The Flyin' Cowboy (1928)
 Clear the Decks (1929)
 The Royal Rider (1929)

References

Bibliography
 George A. Katchmer. A Biographical Dictionary of Silent Film Western Actors and Actresses. McFarland, 2009.

External links

1907 births
1976 deaths
American film actresses
American silent film actresses
People from Lewiston, Idaho
20th-century American actresses